Chinna Papa Periya Papa is a Tamil comedy soap opera that aired on Sun TV. The first two seasons were telecast from 2000 to 2006. A Third Season, with the title Chinna Papa Periya Papass, premiered on 15 November 2014 on Sun TV and aired on every Saturday at 10:30PM IST until 5 May 2018 for 174 Episodes. The show initially starred Sripriya and Nirosha in a titular role. Then, years later, Sripriya was replaced by actresses such as Kalpana and Seema and followed by Nalini with Devadarshini replaced Nirosha. After few years the series started with a fresh season with new casts in addition to Nalini and Nirosha, are V. J. Chitra and Jangiri Madhumitha. The show was produced by Radaan Mediaworks.

Plot 
Chinna Papa is a wealthy woman who lives in Indra nagar , who loves money and loves showing off. Periya Papa is her daughter-in-law. The series is about the funny situations in their home. At times they land themselves in trouble while trying to prank each other. The relationship between mother-in-law and daughter-in-law has been portrayed in a humorous way, similar to Tom and Jerry's.

Cast

Season 1 (2000-2002): 
 Sripriya as Chinna Papa
 Nirosha as Kavitha alias Periya Papa
 M. S. Bhaskar as Pattabi
 Madan Bob as Vasudevan
 Suresh Chakravarthi as Harish (Chinna Papa's son and Periya Papa's husband)
 Delhi Kumar as Bakthavachalam (Periya Papa's father)

Season 2 (2002-2005): 
        Chinna Papa Periya Papa Season 2
 Sripriya as Chinna Papa (Ep. 1-51)
 Kalpana as Chinna Papa (Ep. 52–104)
 Seema (Ep. 107–167) 
 Nalini as Chinna Papa (Ep. 168–218)
 Nirosha as Periya Papa (Ep. 1–175)
 Devadharshini as Periya Papa (Ep. 176–218)
 M. S. Bhaskar as Pattabi
 Mohan Raman as Vasudevan
 Vijay Sarathy as Harish (Chinna Papa's son and Periya Papa's husband)
 Delhi Kumar as Bakthavachalam (Periya Papa's father)
 Chaams as Chidambaram
 Vasu Vikram as Pazhani
 Vikram Khanna as Pizza

Season 3 (2014-2018): 
       Chinna Papa Periya Papas Season 3
 Nalini as Chinna Papa
 V. J. Chitra as Periya Papa
 Jangiri Madhumita as Pappu
 Nirosha as Kakinada Kanagadurga, Pappu's mom
 Kurinji Nathan as Kopalakrishnan (Koki), Chinna Papa's second son and Pappu's husband
 Sheva Raj as Vajrakomban (Vajju)
 Vetrivelan as Balakrishnan (Balki), Chinna Papa's elder son and Periya Papa's husband
 R.Srimati as kiya guest role in 133 Special
 Ep. 1 to 23 sat at 10pm, Ep. 24 to 82 sat at 10Pm to 10.30 and Ep.83 to 173 sat at 10.30Pm 
CPPP 3 Climax special at Sunday at 9.30
| Totaly episode 203
′

Season 4 (2023):  
 Nalini as Chinna Papa
 Preethi sharma as Periya Papa
 Nirosha as Kakinada Kanagadurga, Pappu and Ravi mom
 Kurinji Nathan as gopalashakthi alias (gopal)
 Sheva Raj as Vajukkarasan
 Jangiri Madhumitha as pappu alias nethra
 Ramji as chandrakumar (Chandran)
 Jitendra Nokewal as Ravi, Pappu's Brother
 R.Shrimati as Shavethiri, Periya Papa's Mom

Cast and Characters
{| class="wikitable" style="text-align:center;"
|-
! rowspan="2" | Character
! colspan="4" | Seasons
|-
! "width:10%;"| Season 1 
! "width:10%;"| Season 2 
! "width:10%;"| Season 3 
! "width:10%;"| Season 4
|-
! rowspan="4" | Chinna Papa
| rowspan="4" | Sripriya
| Sripriya (Ep. 1-51)
| rowspan="4" | Nalini
|-
|Kalpana (Ep. 107-167)
|-
|Seema (Ep. 52-104)
|-
|Nalini  (Ep. 168-218)
|Nalini  
|-
! rowspan="2" | Periya Papa
| rowspan="2" |  Nirosha
| Nirosha (Ep. 1-104)
|rowspan="2" |Chitra Kamaraj (Ep. 1-98)
Jangiri Madhumitha (Named as pappu) (Ep. 98-175)
|rowspan="2" |Preethi sharma
|-
| Devadharshini (Ep. 168-218)
|-
! Pattabi 
| colspan="2" | M.S. Bhaskar
| Sheva Raj(Named as Vajju)
| Sheva Raj(Named as Vajji)
|-
! Vasudevan
| Madan Bob
| Mohan Raman
| style="background:lightgrey;" | 
| style="background:lightgrey;" |
|-
! Harish
| Suresh Chakravarthi
| Vijay Sarathy
| Vetrivelan (Named as Balki)
|Ramji (Named as Chandran)
|-
! Pappu
| style="background:lightgrey;" |
| style="background:lightgrey;" |
| Jangiri Madhumita (Ep. 1-98)
| Jangiri Madhumitha
|-
! Koki
| style="background:lightgrey;" |
| style="background:lightgrey;" |
| Kurinji Naathan
| Kurinji Naathan (named as gopal)

|-
! Kanaga Durga
| style="background:lightgrey;" |
| style="background:lightgrey;" |
| Nirosha
| Nirosha
|
|-
! Savethiri
| style="background:lightgrey;" |
| style="background:lightgrey;" |
| style="background:lightgrey;" |
| Sri mathi
|
|- 
| Ravi
| style="background:lightgrey;" |
| style="background:lightgrey;" |
| style="background:lightgrey;" |
| Jitendra Nokewal
|-
|

References

External links 

 Official Website 

Sun TV original programming
2000 Tamil-language television series debuts
Tamil-language television shows
2018 Tamil-language television series endings